James McLean (died September 17, 1956) was an American politician from Maryland. He served as a member of the Maryland House of Delegates, representing Harford County, from 1949 to 1950.

Early life
James McLean was born in New York. He was educated in England.

Career
McLean held a seat on the New York Stock Exchange. He worked with the Cunard Steamship Company and he served as a major with the United States Army during World War II.

McLean was a Democrat. McLean was appointed a member of the Maryland House of Delegates, representing Harford County, from 1949 to 1950, following the death of Earle R. Burkins.

Personal life
McLean married Violet Dorothea Burd Grubb. He had three sons, Peter, Thomas and James. McLean purchased Monmouth Farm in Harford County after World War II.

McLean died on September 17, 1956, at the age of 48, at Franklin Square Hospital in Baltimore County, Maryland. He was buried at St. Mary's Episcopal Church in Emmorton, Maryland.

References

Year of birth uncertain
1900s births
1956 deaths
People from New York (state)
People from Harford County, Maryland
United States Army personnel of World War II
Democratic Party members of the Maryland House of Delegates